Si Racha is a district in Chonburi province, Thailand. Its center is the town of Si Racha, on the Gulf of Thailand, about halfway between Chonburi and Pattaya. The name Si Racha is from Sanskrit Śrī Rāja via Pali.

Si Racha is in an industrial zone consisting of manufacturing and shipping industries, supported by the port of Laem Chabang, 20th largest in the world. With Chonburi to the north and Pattaya, Bang Lamung township, Laem Chabang to the south, it forms the bulk of the economic zone of the eastern seaboard of Thailand, a fast-growing area that is second to only greater Bangkok in population and wealth. Due to its infrastructure, Laem Chabang and the eastern seaboard in general, is the nation's leading entrepôt.

 the population of the district was 323,797.

Around the 1930s, Si Racha sea was known as a shark-infested area. They used to attack humans such as villagers, fishermen and even German tourist.

Geography

To the north is Mueang Chonburi district, to the northeast Ban Bueng district, to the southeast Pluak Daeng district of Rayong Province, and to the south is Bang Lamung district.

Administration

Central administration 
Si Racha is divided into eight sub-districts (tambon), which are further subdivided into 72 administrative villages (muban).

Local administration 
There are two cities (thesaban nakhon) in the district:
 Laem Chabang consisting of sub-district Thung Sukhla and parts of sub-districts Surasak, Bueng, Nong Kham, and Bang Lamung.
 Chao Phraya Surasak consisting of parts of sub-districts Surasak, Bueng, Nong Kham, Khao Khansong, and Bo Win.

There is one town (thesaban mueang) in the district: Si Racha consisting of sub-district Si Racha, and one sub-district municipality (thesaban tambon), Bang Phra consisting of parts of sub-district Bang Phra.

There are four sub-district administrative organizations (SAO) in the district:
 Nong Kham consisting of parts of sub-district Nong Kham.
 Khao Khansong consisting of parts of sub-district Khao Khansong.
 Bang Phra consisting of parts of sub-district Bang Phra.
 Bo Win consisting of parts of sub-district Bo Win.

References

External links

Si Racha